The Guam Constitutional Convention of 1977 was a constitutional convention that took place in Agana, Guam, in 1977.

Authorization of the Guam Constitutional Convention
Under the authority granted by the U.S. Congress under Public Law 94-584, Guam Senator Frank F. Blas introduced Bill 978, which would establish the Guam Constitutional Convention. The bill was substituted by the Committee on Rules and passed the Guam Legislature unanimously with 21 votes, and was enacted as Public Law 13-202 by Governor Ricardo J. Bordallo. The law provided for the election of delegates by municipality based upon population, as determined by the election commission. It provided for a referendum to approve the constitution following the convention.

Delegates Elected to the Guam Constitutional Convention of 1977
A special election was held on April 16, 1977, at which delegates were elected to the Constitutional Convention. The following is a list of the delegates who were elected and from which municipal district each was elected.

Proceedings of the Guam Constitutional Convention of 1977
The convention was convened on May 4, 1977, by Speaker Joseph F. Ada. Members of the Convention selected Carl T.C. Gutierrez to act as Chairman of the convention. On December 15, 1977, the delegates signed the draft constitution.

Referendum on the Draft Constitution
Following the approval of the draft Constitution by President Jimmy Carter and the U.S. Congress, Senator Carmen A. Kasperbauer introduced Guam Public Law 15–23, which postponed the referendum on the draft Constitution until August 4, 1979.
Eighty-two percent of those who voted in the 1979 referendum voted to reject the constitution.

References

Further reading
 

History of Guam
+Guam
1977 in Guam